John Arthur Maguire (November 29, 1870 – July 1, 1939) was an American Democratic Party politician.

He was born near Elizabeth, Illinois on November 29, 1870, and moved to the Dakota Territory in 1882 with his parents settling near what is now Plankinton, South Dakota. He graduated from Plankinton High School in 1889 and attended the Agricultural College in Brookings, South Dakota from 1890 to 1893. He graduated from the Iowa State College of Agriculture (now Iowa State University) at Ames, Iowa in 1893 and the law department of the University of Nebraska-Lincoln in 1899.

He was deputy treasurer of Lancaster County, Nebraska from 1899 to 1901, also passing the bar in 1899. He set up practice in Lincoln, Nebraska in 1902. He was a delegate to the 1904 Democratic National Convention and the secretary to the Democratic State committee in 1905.

He was elected in 1909 to the Sixty-first United States Congress and reelected to the Sixty-second and Sixty-third Congresses. He ran unsuccessfully for reelection in 1914, returning then to his practice of law in Lincoln. He was appointed a municipal judge on January 1, 1938 and died on July 1, 1939. He is buried in Calvary Cemetery in Lincoln.

References
 
 
 
 

1870 births
1939 deaths
Politicians from Lincoln, Nebraska
University of Nebraska College of Law alumni
Nebraska lawyers
People from Aurora County, South Dakota
People from Elizabeth, Illinois
Democratic Party members of the United States House of Representatives from Nebraska